Kepler-71 is a yellow main sequence star in the constellation of Cygnus.

Star characteristics 
Kepler-71 is enriched by heavy elements at 170% of Sun metallicity, young and has a very prominent starspot activity. Starspots are covering about 40% of star surface at transit latitudes, each planetary transit passing over an average six starspots. The bright facula regions are even more extensive. Unlike Sun, the photosphere of Kepler-71 rotates nearly like rigid body, with differential rotation not exceeding 2%.

Planetary system 
The "Hot Jupiter" class planet Kepler-71b was discovered around Kepler-71 in 2010.

References 

Cygnus (constellation)
Planetary systems with one confirmed planet
G-type main-sequence stars
217
Planetary transit variables